Park Sil (8 October 1939 – 29 October 2022) was a South Korean journalist and politician. A member of the New Korean Democratic Party, the Peace Democratic Party, the Democratic Party, and the National Congress for New Politics, he served in the National Assembly from 1985 to 1996.

Park died on 29 October 2022, at the age of 83.

References

1939 births
2022 deaths
20th-century South Korean politicians
Members of the National Assembly (South Korea)
Peace Democratic Party politicians
Seoul National University alumni
University of Georgia alumni
South Korean journalists